Intuit Inc. is an American business software company that specializes in financial software. The company is headquartered in Mountain View, California, and the CEO is Sasan Goodarzi.  Intuit's products include the tax preparation application TurboTax, personal finance app Mint, the small business accounting program QuickBooks, the credit monitoring service Credit Karma, and email marketing platform Mailchimp.  more than 95% of its revenues and earnings come from its activities within the United States. 

Intuit offered a free online service called TurboTax Free File as well as a similarly named service called TurboTax Free Edition which is not free for most users. In 2019, investigations by ProPublica found that Intuit deliberately steered taxpayers from the free TurboTax Free File to the paid TurboTax Free Edition using tactics including search engine delisting and a deceptive discount targeted to members of the military. As of the 2021 tax filing season, TurboTax no longer participates in the Free File Alliance.

Intuit has lobbied extensively against the IRS providing taxpayers with free pre-filled forms, as is the norm in developed countries.

History
The company was founded in 1983 by Scott Cook and Tom Proulx in Palo Alto, California.

Intuit was conceived by Scott Cook, whose prior work at Procter & Gamble helped him realize that personal computers would lend themselves towards replacements for paper-and-pencil based personal accounting. On his quest to find a programmer he ended up running into Tom Proulx at Stanford. The two started Intuit, which initially operated out of a modest room on University Avenue in Palo Alto. The first version of Quicken was coded in Microsoft's BASIC programming language for the IBM PC and UCSD Pascal for the Apple II by Tom Proulx and had to contend with a dozen serious competitors.

In 1991, Microsoft decided to produce a competitor to Quicken called Microsoft Money. To win retailers' loyalty, Intuit included a US$15 rebate coupon, redeemable on software customers purchased in their stores. This was the first time a software company offered a rebate.

Roughly around the same time the company engaged John Doerr of Kleiner Perkins and diversified its product lineup. In 1993 Intuit went public and used the proceeds to make a key acquisition: the tax-preparation software company Chipsoft based in San Diego. The time after the IPO was marked by rapid growth and culminated with a buyout offer from Microsoft in 1994; at this time Intuit's market capitalization reached US$2 billion.

When the buyout fell through because of the United States Department of Justice's disapproval, the company came under intense pressure in the late 1990s when Microsoft started to compete vigorously with its core Quicken business. In response, Intuit launched new web-based products and put more emphasis on QuickBooks and on TurboTax. The company made a number of investments around this time. Among others, it purchased a large stake in Excite and acquired Lacerte Software, a Dallas-based developer of tax preparation software used by tax professionals. It also divested itself of its online bill payment service unit and extended and strengthened its partnership with CheckFree.

In June 2013, Intuit announced it would sell its financial services unit to private equity firm Thoma Bravo for $1.03 billion.

In June 2015, the firm laid off approximately 5% of its workforce as part of a company reorganization.

As of May 2018, Intuit had more than US$5 billion in annual revenue and a market capitalization of about US$50 billion. In August 2018,  the company announced that Sasan Goodarzi would become Intuit's leader and CEO at the beginning of 2019. Smith will remain chairman of Intuit's board of directors. In August 2020, Intuit QuickBooks Canada was expected to reveal intentions to partner with Digital Main Street, as the company aims to help digitally turn Canadian small businesses.

Legal issues 

Intuit formerly offered a free online service called TurboTax Free File as well as a similarly named service called TurboTax Free Edition which is not free for most users. TurboTax Free File was developed as part of an agreement whereby members of the Free File Alliance would offer tax preparation for individuals below an income threshold for free in exchange for the IRS not providing taxpayers with free pre-filled forms. In 2019, investigations by ProPublica found that Intuit deliberately steered taxpayers from the free TurboTax Free File to the paid TurboTax Free Edition using tactics including search engine delisting and a deceptive discount targeted to members of the military. Subsequent investigations by the Senate Committee on Homeland Security and Governmental Affairs and the New York State Department of Financial Services reached similar conclusions, the latter concluding that Intuit engaged in "unfair and abusive practices".
As of 2022, Intuit is the subject of multiple lawsuits and is under investigation by the FTC and several state attorneys general. On May 4, 2022, Intuit agreed to pay a $141 million settlement over misleading advertisements.

Current products
CEO Sasan Goodarzi oversees all products in all countries.

TurboTax
Offered in Basic, Standard, Premier, and Home & Business versions, as well as TurboTax 20 for preparing multiple returns.
QuickBooks
Small business accounting and financial management software, offered in EasyStart, Pro, and Premier versions.
QuickBooks Online
Web-based accounting software designed for companies to review business financials through live data and insights to help make clear business decisions.
Mint.com
Web-based personal finance service.
ProConnect
Professional tax products, including ProConnect Tax Online, Lacerte, ProSeries Professional, ProSeries Basic, and EasyAcct.
Credit Karma
Access to credit scores, reports, and monitoring.
QuickBooks Commerce
Open platform that consolidate sales channels into a central hub for product-based small businesses.
Mailchimp
E-mail marketing platform.

International operations

Canada 

Intuit Canada ULC, an indirect wholly owned subsidiary of Intuit, is a developer of financial management and tax preparation software for personal finance and small business accounting. Services are delivered on a variety of platforms including application software, software connected to services, software as a service, platform as a service and mobile applications. Intuit Canada has employees located all across Canada, with offices in Edmonton, Alberta, and Toronto, Ontario.

Intuit Canada traces its origins to the 1993 acquisition by Intuit of a Canadian tax preparation software developer. In 1992, Edmontonians and University of Alberta graduates Bruce Johnson and Chad Frederick had built a tax preparation product called WINTAX – Canada's first Microsoft Windows-based personal tax preparation software. In 1993, they agreed to be acquired by Chipsoft, manufacturer of the U.S. personal income tax software TurboTax. Shortly after the WINTAX acquisition, Chipsoft agreed to merge with Intuit, the developer of the Quicken financial software. Intuit Canada continued to update and support the WINTAX software, which was renamed QuickTax in 1995 and then renamed TurboTax in 2010. Intuit Canada quickly became the hub for international development at Intuit, producing localized versions of Quicken and QuickBooks for Canada (in French and English) and the United Kingdom. The U.K. version of Quicken was discontinued in 2005.

Current products of Intuit Canada 

 TurboTax (formerly QuickTax) – offered in Basic, Standard, Premier, and Home & Business versions, as well as TurboTax 20 for preparing multiple returns. 
 – French-language version of TurboTax – offered in de base, de luxe, premier and particuliers et entreprises versions.
TurboTax online – Online versions of Free, Student, Standard, Premier and Home & Business.
 – Online versions of  gratuit, étudiant, de luxe, premier and particuliers et entreprises.
SnapTax – an iPhone app that allows users to complete their income tax return on their iPhone
TurboTax Refund Calculator – an iPad app that estimates tax returns and illustrates how changes, such as having a baby, can impact your income tax return
QuickBooks – Small business accounting and financial management software, offered in EasyStart, Pro and Premier versions.
QuickBooks Payroll Solutions – extends QuickBooks Pro and Premier into an in-house payroll solution.
Intuit Merchant Service for QuickBooks – lets you process credit and debit transactions directly in any version of QuickBooks.
QuickBooks Enterprise Solutions  – for midsized companies that require more capacity, functionality and support than is offered by traditional small business accounting software; includes QuickBooks Payroll.
QuickBooks Online – an online small business accounting and financial management solution, offered in EasyStart, Essentials, and Plus versions.
Intuit GoPayment – process and receive payments on the go through your mobile device.
  – French-language version of QuickBooks, offered in Succès PME, Succès PME Pro, and Succès PME Premier versions
QuickBooks Succès PME Service de paie – French-language version of the Payroll Solutions
ProFile Basic and Premier Editions – Professional Tax Preparation Packages

Discontinued products of Intuit Canada 

TaxWiz – Tax preparation software – the company purchased in 2002, discontinued in 2007.
WillExpert – A software package for preparing personal wills (for use within all of Canada with the exception of Quebec, due to specific provincial legislation).

In 2008, Intuit Canada discontinued the TaxWiz software and added QuickTax Basic to their lineup.  Changes made by the Canada Revenue Agency forced Intuit and other tax preparing software companies to limit the number of returns available from their software to 20. This caused Intuit Canada to stop offering QuickTax Pro50 and Pro100 products, and they now offer QuickTax 20 as an alternative. Intuit Canada has since announced that for the 2010 tax year, they will discontinue use of the name QuickTax and replace it with the name TurboTax – thus bringing the product in line with Intuit's American tax-filing software.

Online communities 
Intuit has several online communities, some of which offer integration or cross-sells into its other products. These include QuickBooks online community for QuickBooks users and small business owners, Quicken Online Community for Quicken users and those who need help with the personal finances, and the Accountant Online Community and Jump Up. Each consists of blogs, an expert locator map and event calendar, forums and discussion groups, podcasts, videocasts and webinars, and other user-created content.

JumpUp (formerly JackRabbit Beta) is a free social networking and resources site for small business owners and/or start-ups. Free tools and services include an interactive business planner, online training for developing a successful business plan, starting costs calculator, cash flow calculator, break-even calculator, templates for business planning and sample business plans.

TaxAlmanac is a free online tax research resource. The site includes information including the Internal Revenue Code, Treasury Regulations, Tax Court Cases, and a variety of articles.

Modeled after English Wikipedia, TaxAlmanac was launched in May 2005. The June 6, 2005 edition of Time magazine featured an article entitled "It's a Wiki, Wiki World" about English Wikipedia in which TaxAlmanac was highlighted as "A Community of Customers". The November 21, 2005 edition of Business Week featured an article titled "50 Smart Ways to Use the Web" in which TaxAlmanac was selected as one of the 50. The product made the short list as one of the 7 in the collaboration category. Intuit shut down TaxAlmanac effective June 1, 2014. Many of the users have migrated to a new site called TaxProTalk.com.

Zipingo was a free website where users could rate services such as contractors, restaurants, and other businesses. Ratings and comments were either entered from the website or through Quicken and QuickBooks. The site was closed by Intuit on August 23, 2007.

Finances 
For the fiscal year 2021, Intuit reported earnings of US$2.062 billion, with an annual revenue of US$9.633 billion, an increase of 25.4% over the previous fiscal cycle. Intuit's shares traded at over $498.18 per share and total international net revenue was less than 5% of total net revenue.

Acquisitions and carve-outs

1990s 
In 1993, Intuit acquired Chipsoft, a tax preparation software company based in San Diego.

In 1994, the firm acquired the tax preparation software division of Best Programs of Reston, VA. In the same year, Intuit acquired Parsons Technology from Bob Parsons for $64 million.

In 1996, it acquired GALT Technologies, Inc of Pittsburgh, PA.

In 1998, it acquired Lacerte Software Corp., which now operates as an Intuit subsidiary.  The Lacerte subsidiary focuses on tax software used by professional accountants who prepare taxes for a living. It is generally used by larger firms with more complex workflows and clients.

On March 2, 1999, Intuit acquired Computing Resources Inc. of Reno, Nevada for approximately $200 million. This acquisition allowed Intuit to offer a payroll processing platform through its QuickBooks software program. In December 1999, Intuit purchased Rock Financial for a sum of $532M. The company was renamed Quicken Loans. In June 2002, Rock Financial founder Dan Gilbert led a small group of private investors in purchasing the Quicken Loans subsidiary back from Intuit.

2000s 
In 2001, Intuit invested in UK market, hiring a local management team led by Stephen Lee, managing director, and Neil Atkins, marketing director, with an aim to become Europe's leading B2B & B2C packaged accounts solution.

In 2002, the firm  acquired Management Reports International, a Cleveland-based real estate management software firm. The firm was renamed Intuit Real Estate Solutions (IRES) and offers real estate management products  for Windows and the web.  In 2002, it acquired Eclipse ERP for $88 million, a real-time transaction processing accounting software used for order fulfillment, inventory control, accounting, purchasing, and sales  

In 2003, it acquired 'Innovative Merchant Solutions' (IMS).a firm that provided merchant services to all types of businesses nationwide. The acquisition gave Intuit the ability to process credit cards through its core product, QuickBooks, without the need for hardware leasing. They can also provide traditional terminal-based credit card processing and downloading transactions directly into the QuickBooks software.

In November 2005, Intuit acquired MyCorporation.com, an online business document filing service, for $20 million from original founders Philip and Nellie Akalp.

In September 2006, it acquired StepUp Commerce, an online localized product listing syndicator, for $60 million in cash. In December 2006, it acquired Digital Insight, a provider of online banking services.

On August 17, 2007, Intuit sold Eclipse ERP to Activant, for $100.5 million in cash .

In December 2007, it acquired Electronic Clearing House to add check processing power.In December 2007, it acquired Homestead Technologies   which offers web site creation and e-commerce tools targeted at the small business market, for $170 million.

In April 2009, it acquired Boorah, a restaurant review site. On June 2, 2009, it announced the signing of a definitive agreement to purchase PayCycle Inc., an online payroll services, in an all-cash transaction for approximately $170 million. On September 14, 2009, Intuit Inc. agreed to acquire Mint.com, a free online personal finance service, for $170 million.

2010s 
On January 15, 2010, Intuit Inc. spun off Intuit Real Estate Solutions (which Intuit acquired in 2002) as a stand-alone company. The new company took on its previous moniker, and is now known as MRI Software.

On May 21, 2010, Intuit acquired MedFusion, a Cary, NC leader of Patient to Provider communications for approximately $91 million. On August 10, 2010, it. acquired the personal finance management app Cha-Ching. On June 28, 2011, it acquired the Web banking technology assets of Mobile Money Ventures, a mobile finance provider, for an undisclosed amount. This acquisition is expected to position Intuit as the largest online and mobile technology provider to financial institutions.

On May 18, 2012, it. acquired Demandforce, an automated small business marketing, and customer communications SaaS provider for approximately $423.5 million.

On August 15, 2012, it  announced an agreement to sell their 'Grow Your Business' business unit to Endurance International. The sale included the Intuit Websites and Weblistings products which had been formed from the Homestead Technologies and StepUp Commerce acquisitions.

On July 1, 2013, it announced an agreement to sell their Intuit Financial Services (IFS) business unit (formerly known as Digital Insight) to Thoma Bravo for more than $1.03 billion. On August 19, 2013, it announced that they had sold their Intuit Health business unit (formerly known as MedFusion) back to MedFusion's founder, Steve Malik.

In August 2013, Intuit Inc. acquired tax planning software Good April for an undisclosed amount. On October 23, 2013, it acquired Level Up Analytics, a data consulting firm. On October 30, 2013,it acquired Full Slate, a developer of appointment scheduling software for small businesses.

In May 2014, Intuit Inc. bought Invitco to help bookkeepers put bill processing in the cloud. In May 2014, it acquired Check for approximately $360 million to offer bill pay across small business and personal finance products. In December 2014, it. acquired Acrede, UK-based provider of global, cross-border and cloud-based payroll services.

In March 2015, Intuit Inc. acquired Playbook HR.

In January 2016, Intuit Inc. announced an agreement to sell Demandforce to Internet Brands. On March 3, 2016, Intuit announced plans to sell Quicken to H.I.G. Capital. On March 8, 2016, it announced plans to sell Quickbase to private equity firm Welsh, Carson, Anderson & Stowe.

On May 1, 2017, Intuit announced it was selling  TruPay.

Intuit acquired Bankstream in 2017. On December 5, 2017, Intuit announced its acquisition of TSheets for $340 million.

2020s 
On February 24, 2020, Intuit CEO and leader Sasan Goodarzi announced that it planned to acquire Credit Karma for $7.1 billion. On August 3, 2020, Intuit announced its acquisition of TradeGecko for $100 million.

On September 13, 2021, Intuit announced its acquisition of Mailchimp for $12 billion.

Lobbying

Intuit has lobbied extensively against the IRS providing taxpayers with free pre-filled forms, as is the norm in developed countries.

In 2009, the Los Angeles Times reported that Intuit spent nearly $2 million in political contributions to eliminate free online state tax filing for low-income residents in California. According to the New York Times, from 2009 to 2014, Intuit spent nearly $13 million lobbying, as reported by OpenSecrets, as much as Apple. Intuit spent $1 million on the race for the California state comptroller to support Tony Strickland, a Republican who opposed ReadyReturn, against John Chiang, a Democrat who supported ReadyRun (and won). Joseph Bankman, professor of tax law, Stanford Law School, and advocate of simplified filing, believes that the campaign warned politicians that if they supported free filing, Intuit would help their opponents.

On March 26, 2013, ProPublica reported that the company lobbied against return-free filing as recently as 2011. One year later, ProPublica reported that the company appeared to be linked to a number of op-eds and letters to Congress in a campaign advocating against direct tax filing backed by the Computer & Communications Industry Association, an advocacy organization of which Intuit is a member.

Lawsuits

An antitrust lawsuit and a class-action suit relating to cold calling employees of other companies were settled out of court along with Apple and Google.

In March 2015, The Washington Post and computer reporter Brian Krebs reported that two former employees alleged that Intuit knowingly allowed fraudulent returns to be processed on a massive scale as part of a revenue-boosting scheme. Both employees, former security team members for the company, stated that the company had ignored repeated warnings and suggestions on how to prevent fraud. One of the employees was reported to have filed a whistleblower complaint with the US Securities and Exchange Commission.

See also

 Comparison of accounting software
 APS Payroll
 Automatic Data Processing (ADP)
 H&R Block
 Paychex
 Paylocity Corporation
 Reckon
 Square (payment service)
 SurePayroll
 Sage Software
 TaxACT
 Xero

References

Citations

General references 

  - recounts the early years of Intuit, including the aborted acquisition by Microsoft.
 Intuit to Make Health 'Quicken' – Health Data Management, April 13, 2006
 CIGNA to offer members Intuit's Quicken Health – San Jose Business Journal, April 25, 2007
 Business tax software: Take control of your tax claims – review of QuickTax Business Incorporated 2007 and Business Unincorporated 2007

External links

 
1983 establishments in California
1993 initial public offerings
American companies established in 1983
Companies based in Mountain View, California
Financial services companies established in 1983
Financial software companies
Software companies based in the San Francisco Bay Area
Software companies established in 1983
Software companies of the United States
Tax preparation companies of the United States